Smyčka (The Noose) is a Czech novel, written by Pavel Kohout. It was first published in 2008 by Pistorius & Olšanská.

References

2008 Czech novels
Novels set in the 1940s
Novels set in the 1950s